Córdoba Municipality may refer to:
 Córdoba, Quindío, Colombia
 Córdoba, Bolívar, Colombia
 Córdoba, Nariño, Colombia

See also
 Córdoba (disambiguation)

Municipality name disambiguation pages